Hemicordulia continentalis is a species of dragonfly in the family Corduliidae, 
known as the fat-bellied emerald. It inhabits pools, lakes, ponds and swamps in coastal Queensland and northern New South Wales, Australia.

Hemicordulia continentalis is a small to medium-sized, black and yellow dragonfly with long legs. The male abdomen is swollen giving the appearance of a club. In both males and females the inboard edge of the hindwing is rounded.

Gallery

See also
 List of Odonata species of Australia

References

Corduliidae
Odonata of Australia
Endemic fauna of Australia
Taxa named by René Martin
Insects described in 1907